"Amen"  is a song by Italian singer/songwriter Francesco Gabbani. The song was released as a digital download on 27 November 2015 through BMG and Warner Music Group as the lead single from his second studio album Eternamente ora (2016). The song has peaked to number 14 on the Italian Singles Chart.

Music video
A music video to accompany the release of "Amen" was first released onto YouTube on 1 December 2015 at a total length of three minutes and nineteen seconds. The video was shot at the Calacata Borghini mine in Carrara and directed by Daniele Barraco.

Track listing

Charts

Weekly charts

Release history

References

2016 singles
2016 songs
Warner Music Group singles
Songs written by Francesco Gabbani
Francesco Gabbani songs
Sanremo Music Festival songs